As Frenéticas (The Frenetics) was a six-piece Brazilian girl group formed in 1976 in Rio de Janeiro, at the peak of nightclubs' success in Brazil.

History 
On 5 August 1976, composer and music producer Nelson Motta opened a nightclub at a shopping center in Gávea, Rio de Janeiro; it was named Frenetic Dancing Days Discotheque and was a huge success. In order to serve customers at the few tables available, he hired singer-waitresses that would perform three or four songs by surprise. Sandra Pêra (Motta's sister-in-law on behalf of her sister Marília Pêra) showed interest in the position and brought her friends Regina Chaves, Leiloca and Lidoka, who were once members of Dzi Croquettes, and singer Dhu Moraes. Suggested by the club's DJ, actress Edyr de Castro, who took part in Hair musical, completed the sextet. A repertoire of five songs was set and they had some sessions with Roberto de Carvalho, who would later marry and work with Rita Lee.

Named "As Frenéticas" after the nightclub, they started to perform for over an hour and soon left their jobs as waitresses. Their performances combined erotic clothes, humor and lyrics with energetic performances. Following the end of Motta's nightclub, As Frenéticas were hired by Warner, then recently established in Brazil. Their first single, "A Felicidade Bate à Sua Porta", by Gonzaguinha, received heavy radio airplay. Soon after, their debut album Frenéticas sold well.

In 2016, Lidoka was reported dead.

Discography

Studio albums

Compilations

Singles

References 

 Noites Tropicais. Nelson Motta. 2000. Ed. Objetiva.
 Frenéticas at Cliquemusic - UOL
 Edyr Duqui at Rádio UOL
 Dhu Moraes at Isto É Gente
 Leiloca's official website 
 

Brazilian girl groups
Musical groups established in 1976
Brazilian pop music groups
Disco groups
Musical groups from Rio de Janeiro (city)